The 2007 NHRA Full Throttle Drag Racing Season was the first NHRA season to include the Countdown to the Championship.

Schedule

Points standings

Drivers in bold have clinched the championship

References 

NHRA
NHRA Full Throttle